Scott Barrow may refer to:
 Scott Barrow (footballer) (born 1988), Welsh footballer
 Scott Barrow (born 1987), Australian rapper known as Kerser
 Scott Barrow (rugby) (born 1980), British rugby union and rugby league player

See also
Scott Barrows (born 1963), American football player